The 2017–18 SpVgg Gr. Fürth season is the 115th season in the football club's history and 5th consecutive season in the second division of German football, the 2. Bundesliga and 29th overall. In addition to the league business, the Kleeblätter also are participating in this season's edition of the domestic cup, the DFB-Pokal. They play in their 118th consecutive year in their stadium, Sportpark Ronhof Thomas Sommer, while ongoing redevelopment of the main stand is in progress since 2016.

Players

Squad information

Transfers

Summer

In:

Out:

Matches

Legend

Friendly matches

2. Bundesliga

League table

Matches

DFB-Pokal

References

Furth
SpVgg Greuther Fürth seasons